Ogris is a surname. Notable people with the surname include:

 Andreas Ogris (born 1964), Austrian footballer and manager
 Ernst Ogris (1967–2017), Austrian footballer